The following is a list of "K" codes for Medical Subject Headings (MeSH), as defined by the United States National Library of Medicine (NLM).

This list continues the information at List of MeSH codes (J02). Codes following these are found at List of MeSH codes (L01). For other MeSH codes, see List of MeSH codes.

The source for this content is the set of 2006 MeSH Trees from the NLM.

– humanities

– art
  – caricatures
  – cartoons
  – engraving and engravings
  – human body
  – medical illustration
  –  artistic anatomy
  – medicine in art
  – numismatics
  – paintings
  – philately
  – portraits
  – sculpture

– awards and prizes
  – Nobel Prize

– ethics
  – bioethical issues
  – bioethics
  –  clinical ethics
  – complicity
  – conflict of interest
  – ethical analysis
  – casuistry
  – retrospective moral judgment
  – wedge argument
  – ethical relativism
  – ethical review
  – ethics consultation
  – ethical theory
  – ethicists
  – ethics committees
  –  clinical ethics committees
  –  research ethics committees
  –  business ethics
  –  institutional ethics
  –  professional ethics
  – codes of ethics
  – Helsinki Declaration
  – Hippocratic Oath
  –  clinical ethics
  –  dental ethics
  –  medical ethics
  – Hippocratic Oath
  –  nursing ethics
  –  pharmacy ethics
  –  research ethics
  – Helsinki Declaration
  – humanism
  – feminism
  – morals
  – conscience
  – moral development
  – social responsibility
  – moral obligations
  – virtues
  – personhood
  – principle-based ethics
  – beneficence
  – personal autonomy
  – social justice
  – professional misconduct
  – scientific misconduct

– knowledge

– history
  – alchemy
  – anniversaries and special events
  – archives
  – museums
  – emblems and insignia
  – genealogy and heraldry
  – historiography
  –  ancient history
  –  medieval history
  –  early modern 1451–1600 history
  –  15th century history
  –  16th century history
  –  modern 1601– history
  –  17th century history
  –  18th century history
  – American Revolution
  – French Revolution
  –  19th century history
  – American Civil War
  – Crimean War
  –  1898 Spanish-American war
  –  20th century history
  – Russian-Japanese War
  – World War I
  – World War II
  – Korean War
  – Vietnam conflict
  – Chernobyl nuclear accident
  – Gulf War
  –  21st century history
  – September 11 terrorist attacks
  – history of dentistry
  – history of medicine
  – barber surgeons
  – grave robbing
  –  Arabic medicine
  –  Unani medicine
  – history of nursing
  – natural history
  – phrenology
  – symbolism
  – metaphor

– literature
  – anecdotes
  – aphorisms and proverbs
  – Bible
  – biography
  – autobiography
  – famous persons
  – drama
  –  medieval literature
  –  modern literature
  – medicine in literature
  – mythology
  – philology
  –  classical philology
  –  oriental philology
  –  romance philology
  – poetry
  – wit and humor

– music

– occultism
  – astrology

– philosophy
  – postmodernism
  – qi
  – esthetics
  – beauty
  – ethics
  – complicity
  – double effect
  – ethical analysis
  – casuistry
  – retrospective moral judgment
  – wedge argument
  – ethical relativism
  – ethical theory
  – humanism
  – feminism
  – morals
  – conscience
  – social responsibility
  – moral obligations
  – virtues
  – personhood
  – principle-based ethics
  – beneficence
  – personal autonomy
  – social justice
  – existentialism
  – life
  – beginning of human life
  – quality of life
  – value of life
  – logic
  – fuzzy logic
  – metaphysics
  –  dental philosophy
  –  dental ethics
  –  medical philosophy
  – empiricism
  –  medical ethics
  – holistic health
  – humoralism
  –  nursing philosophy
  –  nursing ethics
  – holistic nursing
  – symbolism
  – metaphor
  – thanatology
  – utopias
  – vitalism
  – yin-yang

– religion
  – anthroposophy
  – Buddhism
  – Christianity
  – Catholicism
  – Christian Science
  – The Church of Jesus Christ of Latter-day Saints
  – Eastern Orthodoxy
  – Jehovah's Witnesses
  – Protestantism
  – saints
  – Hinduism
  – Islam
  – Judaism
  – religion and medicine
  – religion and psychology
  – spirituality
  – religion and science
  – religion and sex
  – religious philosophies
  – Confucianism
  – mysticism
  – spiritualism
  – yoga
  – theology

– secularism

The list continues at List of MeSH codes (L01).

K01